Kyoto Shiyakusho-mae Station (京都市役所前駅 Kyōto shiyakusho-mae eki) is a stop on the Tozai Line of Kyoto Municipal Subway in Kyoto, Japan. It is in Nakagyo-ku. With the station number designation T12, its station color is kara kurenai. Because it lies beneath the Kawaramachi-Oike intersection, the station also carries signs with the name Kawaramachi Oike.

The station has one island platform serving two tracks.  Most trains of the Keihan Railway Keishin Line make their last stop at Kyoto Shiyakusho-mae before reversing direction.

The station, the name of which means "in front of City Hall," is the closest to the offices of Kyoto's city government. The Honnō-ji was rebuilt nearby, rather than at its original location, following the Incident at Honnōji. Also in the vicinity is the Kyoto office of the Bank of Japan.

History
The Kyoto Shiyakusho-mae Station opened on October 12, 1997, date when the Tōzai line initiated operations between Daigo Station and Nijō Station.

Layout
Kyoto Shiyakusho-mae Station has an island platform with two tracks under Oike Dori and Kawaramachi Dori.

Surroundings
Kyoto City Hall
Kyoto City Fire Department
Honno-ji
Bank of Japan Kyoto Office
Zest Oike
the site of the Ikedaya Inn
The Kyoto Hotel Okura
Kyoto Royal Hotel & Spa (Ishin Hotels Group)
Hotel Ritz-Carlton Kyoto
Teramachi Dori
Shikyogoku Shopping Arcade
Shimadzu Memorial Hall

References

External links
 Kyoto Shiyakusyo-mae Station map

Railway stations in Kyoto Prefecture
Railway stations in Japan opened in 1997